Lama Lama or Lamalama may refer to:

 Lama Lama people, an ethnic group of Australia
 Lama-Lama language, a language of Australia
 Lama Lama National Park, in Australia

See also 
 Llama llama (disambiguation)
 Lama (disambiguation)

Language and nationality disambiguation pages